The Hampel Report (January 1998) was designed to be a revision of the corporate governance system in the UK. The remit of the committee was to review the Code laid down by the Cadbury Report (now found in the Combined Code). It asked whether the code's original purpose was being achieved. Hampel found that there was no need for a revolution in the UK corporate governance system. The Report aimed to combine, harmonise and clarify the Cadbury and Greenbury recommendations.

On the question of in whose interests companies should be run, its answer came with clarity.

The Hampel Report relied more on broad principles and a 'common sense' approach which was necessary to apply to different situations rather than Cadbury and Greenbury's 'box-ticking' approach.

See also 
 Combined Code
 Cadbury Report (1992)
 Greenbury Report (1995)
 Turnbull Report
 Higgs Report (2003)
 Smith Report (2003)

Notes

External links 
 Full text of the combined code 2006 
 Full text of the combined code 2003
 The Financial Services Authority Listing Rules online and in pdf format, under which there is an obligation to comply with the Combined Code, or explain why it is not complied with, under LR 9.8.6(6).
 The Financial Reporting Council's website

Reports on finance and business
Economic history of the United Kingdom
1998 in economics
1998 in the United Kingdom
Corporate governance in the United Kingdom